Bilcza refers to the following places in Poland:

 Bilcza, Kielce County
 Bilcza, Sandomierz County